Cockrum may refer to:

Cockrum, Mississippi, an unincorporated community
Cockrum, Missouri, an unincorporated community
Chris Cockrum. a stock car driver
Dave Cockrum. a comic book artist